The Los Angeles County Assessor is the assessor and officer of the government of Los Angeles County responsible for discovering all taxable property in Los Angeles County, except for state-assessed property, to inventory and list all the taxable property, to value the property, and to enroll the property on the local assessment roll. In 2021, there were  assessed properties for a total Los Angeles County property assessment value of US$.

The current assessor is Jeffrey Prang. The most recent assessors have been John Noguez, Robert Quon, who served for the last year of Rick Auerbach's term, and Kenneth P. Hahn.

Assessments
The Assessor is responsible for discovering all taxable property in Los Angeles County, except for state-assessed property, to inventory and list all the taxable property, to value the property, and to enroll the property on the local assessment roll. It is then the responsibility of the Los Angeles County Treasurer and Tax Collector to bill and collect these taxes, and the responsibility of the Los Angeles County Auditor-Controller to allocate the taxes to the appropriate taxing jurisdictions such as the County, cities, schools and special districts within the County.

In 2021 there were  assessed properties for a total Los Angeles County property assessment value of nearly US$.

The Assessor sells the following cadastral electronic documents and databases pursuant to Article 1 of the Constitution (the "Sunshine Amendment") and the California Public Records Act:

Corruption
In mid-2012, Noguez took a leave of absence because of an investigation concerning influence peddling at his office, and on October 17, 2012, he was arrested and charged with 24 felonies relating to corruption.

List of Assessors

References

External links
Los Angeles County Assessor's Office

Assessor
Government databases in the United States
Real estate in the United States
1850 establishments in California